Not Enough may refer to:

"Not Enough", by 3 Doors Down on their album The Better Life
"Not Enough", by Juliana Hatfield on her album How to Walk Away
"Not Enough", by Lacuna Coil on their album Shallow Life
"Not Enough", by Memphis May Fire on their album Unconditional
"Not Enough", by Our Lady Peace on their album Gravity
"Not Enough", by Van Halen on their album Balance